De Nobili School, Bhuli is a private Catholic secondary school located in Bhuli, in the Dhanbad district of the state of Jharkhand, India. The school is one of eight De Nobili schools run by the Society of Jesus in this coal mining area of India. The school opened in 2009.

The school is named after a christian mission and Jesuit, Roberto de Nobili, who was the first foreigner to master Sanskrit, incognito, in sixteenth century Madurai. He apparently conducted himself like an orthodox Brahmin and is even said to have declared himself to be a descendant of Brahma.

Curriculum
De Nobili is an English medium school but Hindi language and culture have a place in the curriculum. Courses of study offered lead to the Indian Certificate of Secondary Education (ICSE) examinations in Class 10 and the Indian School Certificate (ISC) examinations in Class 12.

See also

 List of Jesuit schools
 List of schools in Jharkhand
 Violence against Christians in India

References  

Jesuit secondary schools in India
Christian schools in Jharkhand
High schools and secondary schools in Jharkhand
Education in Dhanbad district
2009 establishments in Jharkhand
Educational institutions established in 2009